Chaetostoma vagum is a species of catfish in the family Loricariidae. It is native to South America, where it occurs in the Orteguaza River basin, which is part of the Japurá River drainage in Colombia. The species reaches 9.9 cm (3.9 inches) SL.

References 

vagum
Fish described in 1943
Catfish of South America
Fish of Colombia